The Antidote is the sixth studio album by Portuguese gothic metal band Moonspell, released in 2003 by Century Media. It is regarded as a return to a heavier musical style in comparison to the previous album, Darkness and Hope, although it is nonetheless quite different from all the previous albums. The track list was altered for the vinyl version to better suit the side lengths.

The third track, "Everything Invaded", had a music video.

Book 
The album was released with a (limited) book named O Antídoto ("the antidote") by José Luís Peixoto. They both share a single concept and the same story. Each song in the CD is sister to a chapter in the book that enhances the story in the lyrics. The CD contains the book in electronic format.

Track listing

CD

Vinyl

Enhanced CD content 
Multimedia Player with:
 "The Novel of Antidote" (digital book)
 "Everything Invaded" (video)

Personnel 
 Fernando Ribeiro – vocals
 Ricardo Amorim – guitars
 Pedro Paixão – guitars, keyboards, samples
 Miguel Gaspar – drums

Additional personnel
 Niclas Etelävuori – bass
 Paulo Moreira – cover art, layout, photography
 Adriano Esteves – design
 Mika Jussila – mastering
 Hiili Hiilesmaa – producer, engineering, mixing
 Wojtek Blasiak – artwork

Charts

References 

Moonspell albums
2003 albums
Century Media Records albums